Bostrychoceras is a genus of heteromorph ammonite from the family Nostoceratidae.  Fossils have been found in Late Cretaceous sediments in Europe and North America.

The shell of Bostrychoceras begins as a tightly wound helical spire, like that of Nostoceras, from which hangs a U or J shaped body chamber, at least in the adult. The shell is covered with dense, strong, but un-flaired, ribs that are commonly sinuous and oblique. May nor may not have strong constrictions.

Distribution
Cretaceous of Nigeria, Peru, South Africa, Spain and the United States

References
Notes

Bibliography

 Ammonoid Paleobiology (Topics in Geobiology) by Neil H. Landman, Kazushige Tanabe, and Richard Arnold Davis

Ammonitida genera
Nostoceratidae
Late Cretaceous ammonites of Europe
Late Cretaceous ammonites of North America
Campanian life